Danderyd Ship District, or Danderyds skeppslag, was a district of Uppland in Sweden. The ship district (skeppslag) was the equivalent of a hundred (hundare) within Roslagen.

See also
Danderyd Municipality
Subdivisions of Sweden